Kieth Reinhardt Hymmen (June 13, 1913 – January 16, 1978) was a Canadian politician. A member of the Liberal Party, he represented the Waterloo North electoral district from 1965 to 1968, and Kitchener electoral district from 1968 to 1974, in the House of Commons.

The son of Horace Hymmen and Clara Dunke, he was educated in Kitchener and at the University of Toronto. Hymmen became a chemical engineer in Kitchener. In 1940, he married Ruth Amelia Iredale. He served on Kitchener city council and was mayor of Kitchener for six months in 1958 and again from 1963 to 1965. He died in 1978 and was buried at Mount Hope Cemetery in Kitchener.

References 

1913 births
1978 deaths
Liberal Party of Canada MPs
University of Toronto alumni
Members of the House of Commons of Canada from Ontario
Mayors of Kitchener, Ontario
Burials at Mount Hope Cemetery, Kitchener, Ontario